The 1968–69 Nationalliga A season was the 31st season of the Nationalliga A, the top level of ice hockey in Switzerland. 10 teams participated in the league, and HC La Chaux-de-Fonds won the championship.

First round

Final round

Relegation

External links 
 Championnat de Suisse 1968/69

Swiss
National League (ice hockey) seasons
1968–69 in Swiss ice hockey